The men's singles table tennis at the 2015 African Games was held from September 10 to 19, 2015, at several venues.

Draw

Section

References

Table tennis at the 2015 African Games